Universal Juveniles was Max Webster's fifth and last studio album, released in 1980 in Canada by Anthem Records. It was released internationally on the Mercury Records label outside of Canada. 
The album was produced by Jack Richardson who was best known for producing The Guess Who's biggest hit records. It features a guest appearance by friends and fellow Canadian rockers Rush on the song "Battle Scar", recorded live in studio on July 28 1980.

The album was certified Gold by the Canadian Recording Industry Association.

Track listing
All songs written by Kim Mitchell and Pye Dubois, except where indicated
Side one
"In the World of Giants"– 4:18
"Check" – 2:37
"April in Toledo" – 3:40
"Juveniles Don't Stop" – 3:32
"Battle Scar" (feat. Rush) – 5:48

Side two
"Chalkers" (Dave Myles, Dubois) – 3:45
"Drive and Desire" – 3:53
"Blue River Liquor Shine" – 4:15
"What Do You Do with the Urge" (Gary McCracken, Dubois) – 3:20
"Cry Out for Your Life" – 5:33

Personnel
Max Webster
Kim Mitchell – guitar and vocals
Dave Myles – bass
Gary McCracken – drums
Pye Dubois – lyrics

Additional musicians
Doug Riley – piano , clavinet , synthesizer 
David Stone – synthesizer 
Terry Watkinson – keyboards 
Geddy Lee – bass and vocals 
Alex Lifeson – guitar 
Neil Peart – drums 

Production
Jack Richardson – producer, mixing at Soundstage, Toronto, Canada
David Greene – engineer
Lenny DeRose – associate engineer
Ringo Hrycyna – associate mixing engineer
Bob Ludwig – mastering at Masterdisk, New York

References

Other links 
https://web.archive.org/web/20061117022944/http://www.maxwebster.ca/

1980 albums
Max Webster albums
Anthem Records albums
Albums produced by Jack Richardson (record producer)
Mercury Records albums